Nick Careen is a Newfoundland and Labrador politician. He was elected to Newfoundland and Labrador's provincial House of Assembly in the 1993 Newfoundland general election as a Progressive Conservative. He represented Placentia District from 1993 to 1996.

Careen also unsuccessfully ran as an Independent candidate in the February 2006 by-election in Placentia—St. Mary’s. He placed second winning 1,641 votes.

In January 2007, he was appointed to the board of directors of Marine Atlantic.

Election results (partial)

References

Progressive Conservative Party of Newfoundland and Labrador MHAs
Living people
Year of birth missing (living people)
People from Placentia, Newfoundland and Labrador